Trafic (Traffic) is a 1971 Italian-French comedy film directed by Jacques Tati. Trafic was the last film to feature Tati's famous character of Monsieur Hulot, and followed the vein of earlier Tati films that lampooned modern society.

Tati's use of the word "trafic" instead of the usual French word for car traffic (la circulation) may derive from a desire to use the same franglais he used when he called his previous film Playtime, and the primary meaning of trafic is "exchange of goods", rather than "traffic" per se.  The word "Trafic" was subsequently used for a light utility vehicle model manufactured by Renault starting in 1981.

Plot
In Trafic, Hulot is a bumbling automobile designer who works for Altra, a Paris auto plant. Along with a truck driver and Maria, a publicity agent, he takes a new camper-car of his design to an auto show in Amsterdam. On the way there, they encounter various obstacles: getting impounded by Dutch customs guards, a car accident (meticulously choreographed by the filmmakers), and an inefficient mechanic. In the film, “Tati leaves no element of the auto scene unexplored, whether it is the after-battle recovery moments of a traffic-circle chain-reaction accident, whether it a study of drivers in repose or garage-attendants in slow-motion, the gas-station give-away (where the busts of historical figures seem to find their appropriate owners) or the police station bureaucracy.”

Cast
 Jacques Tati as Monsieur Hulot
 Tony Knepper as Mechanic
 Franco Ressel
 Mario Zanuelli
 Maria Kimberly as Maria
 Marcel Fraval as Truck driver
 Honoré Bostel as ALTRA director
 F. Maisongrosse as François

Reception
In 1972, an American reviewer wrote that “Jacques Tati's Traffic is so non-blockbuster, in fact, that it is absolutely therapeutic for today's moviegoer, a velvet-gloved healing hand from the past to remind us of children's laughter and adults' smiles of satisfaction at the comedy that had indeed evoked their laughter at first sight.” Michel Chion has written that “Trafic turns out to be as impure a patchwork as Play Time was pure and intransigent. Nonetheless, it is an endearing film for different reasons: we are invited to a picaresque journey of a man who leaves Paris to go to Amsterdam for a car show, but arrives much too late to participate.”

Gary Giddins has written that “the idea that Trafic is critically regarded as minor Tati is so widespread that even the otherwise illuminating DVD essay by Jonathan Romney retails its presumed failings: ‘a hovering tone of despair,’ the absence of ‘a clearly defined goal,’ ‘humor drawn out or diffuse to the point of near abstraction,’ and ‘[Tati] himself saw it as a step back after the accomplished vision of Play Time’.” Giddins disagrees with this negative assessment, and believes Trafic to have been “transcendent,” as well as “misperceived” and “neglected.”

One review states that the film is “slow going, and even devoted fans will wonder whether they're there yet.” Jonathan Romney writes that “Tati certainly appears less in control than in the vast coordinated ballet of Play Time. For the most part, the jokes in Trafic drum up a sense of languid, almost apathetic chaos (note the distracted workers at the Altra workshop), without there always being conventional payoffs to give the comic business a sense of purpose.”

Home media
The film was released on DVD by The Criterion Collection on 15 July 2008, in a special edition double-disc set, and on Blu-ray on 28 October 2014 as a part of The Complete Jacques Tati.

References

External links
 
 Trafic at Variety Distribution
Trafic: Watching the Wheels an essay by Jonathan Romney at the Criterion Collection

1971 films
1971 comedy films
Italian comedy road movies
French comedy road movies
1970s French-language films
1970s Dutch-language films
1970s English-language films
Films directed by Jacques Tati
Films shot in the Netherlands
1970s comedy road movies
French sequel films
Films produced by Robert Dorfmann
1971 multilingual films
Italian multilingual films
French multilingual films
1970s Italian films
1970s French films
French-language Italian films